Sycacantha nereidopa is a species of moth of the family Tortricidae. It is found in the Democratic Republic of the Congo, Kenya and Uganda.

The larvae feed on the fruit of Coffea species, including Coffea arabica.

References

Moths described in 1927
Olethreutini
Sycacantha